Murtaza Trunkwala (born 20 January 1996) is an Indian cricketer. He made his first-class debut for Maharashtra in the 2016–17 Ranji Trophy on 20 October 2016. He made his List A debut for Maharashtra in the 2017–18 Vijay Hazare Trophy on 17 February 2018.

References

External links
 

1996 births
Living people
Indian cricketers
Maharashtra cricketers
People from Pune district